The Dormition of the Theotokos Cathedral is the most famous Romanian Orthodox church of Cluj-Napoca, Romania. Built in a Romanian Brâncovenesc style, a synthesis of Renaissance and Byzantine architecture, it lies on the Avram Iancu Square, together with the Cluj-Napoca National Theatre and the Avram Iancu Statue.

The cathedral is the seat of the Metropolitan of Cluj, Alba, Crișana and Maramureș. It is dedicated to the Dormition of the Theotokos (Romanian: Adormirea Maicii Domnului).

History
The cathedral was built between 1923 and 1933, after the Union of Transylvania with the Romanian Old Kingdom. Nicolae Ivan (1855–1936), the first bishop of the Bishopric of Cluj, had a very important contribution in suggesting the location of the cathedral and in obtaining the necessary funds for its construction, which began on 10 September 1923. The cornerstone was laid on 7 October 1923, at a ceremony attend by Crown Prince Carol II and Prime Minister Ion I. C. Brătianu.

The project of the cathedral was developed by the architects George Cristinel and Constantin Pomponiu, who also designed the Mausoleum of Mărășești.

On 5 November 1933 the cathedral was officially opened by Miron Cristea, the Patriarch of All Romania, Nicolae Bălan, the Metropolitan of Transylvania, and Nicolae Ivan, the Bishop of Cluj. The opening ceremony was also attended, among many others, by King Carol II and Crown Prince Michael I.

Decoration
The main dome of the cathedral, inspired by the dome of Hagia Sophia in Istanbul, is surrounded by 4 Romanian Brâncovenesc style towers. The 18 large columns supporting the dome are sculpted in stone. The main material used for the construction of the cathedral was stone extracted from Baciu and Banpotoc.

Gallery

Notes

External links

Churches in Cluj-Napoca
Romanian Orthodox cathedrals in Romania
Churches completed in 1933
20th-century Eastern Orthodox church buildings
History of Cluj-Napoca
Neo-Brâncovenesc architecture